Cerebral Ballzy is the debut album from Brooklyn band Cerebral Ballzy. It was released on July 26, 2011 in the United States through Williams Street Records.

Their album was heavily promoted on Adult Swim through a 60-second commercial spot, which is their music video for "Don't Tell Me What to Do". Directed by the film-making duo The Marshall Darlings, the promo is filmed on distorted black and white videotape and starts with a close up of lead singer Honor Titus, as he and his band mates walk outside a nightclub and on the streets yelling out the lyrics of the song shown on the bottom of the screen.

The artwork for the album was done by Raymond Pettibon, who has previously worked with bands such as Sonic Youth, Off!, Foo Fighters and Black Flag.

Track listing

Personnel
 Honor Titus - lead vocals
 Melvin Honore (Mel) - bassist 
 Mason - guitarist
 Jason - guitarist
 Crazy Abe - drummer

References

2011 debut albums
Cerebral Ballzy albums
Adult Swim albums